Land Without Women is a 1929 German drama film directed by Carmine Gallone and starring Conrad Veidt, Elga Brink and Clifford McLaglen. It was based on the novel Die Braut Nr. 68 by Peter Bolt. The film is set amongst a community of gold diggers in Western Australia. It was shot at the Staaken and Templehof Studios in Berlin with sets designed by the art directors Hans Sohnle and Otto Erdmann. It was made by the small independent production company Felsom Film as a Part-talkie film, the first German-speaking sound film to be released. It was followed a month later by the first all-taking film Atlantik, which had been made in Britain.

Cast

References

Bibliography

External links

1929 films
1929 drama films
German drama films
Transitional sound drama films
1920s German-language films
Films directed by Carmine Gallone
Films set in Western Australia
Films produced by Arnold Pressburger
Films of the Weimar Republic
Tobis Film films
German black-and-white films
1920s German films
Films shot at Staaken Studios
Films shot at Tempelhof Studios